This is an incomplete List of mayors and city managers of Worcester, Massachusetts.

City Managers

See also
Mayoral elections in Worcester, Massachusetts

External links

 List of Mayors of Worcester, Massachusetts from the Worcester Public Library

Worcester, Massachusetts
Worcester
 
Mayors